Umit or UMIT may refer to
Ümit, a Turkish name
Ümit, Kastamonu, a village in Turkey
Umit oil field in Turkey
UMIT - Private University for Health Sciences, Medical Informatics and Technology in Tirol, Austria
UMIT, a user interface for Nmap